The Financial Times. a British business newspaper, annually nominates a Person of the Year to the person the newspaper has considered has demonstrated considerable influence in a given year. There appear to have been a number of instances (1971, 1979, 1995) when no person was nominated.

List

Past recipients:

References 

Financial Times
Awards by newspapers